Ganjiakou station is a station on Line 16 of the Beijing Subway.

History 
This station was once known as Fuwai Dajie station. In 2013, it was renamed to Ganjiakou station. The station opened on December 31, 2020. It is planned that the Phase 2 of Line 3 will also stop at this station.

Station Layout 
The station has an underground island platform. There are 3 exits, lettered A, B and C. Exits A and C are accessible via elevators.

References 

Beijing Subway stations in Haidian District
Beijing Subway stations in Xicheng District